The 1999 Oklahoma Sooners football team represented the University of Oklahoma in the 1999 NCAA Division I-A football season, the 105th season of Sooner football. The team was led by first-year head coach Bob Stoops. They played their home games at Oklahoma Memorial Stadium in Norman, Oklahoma. They were a charter member of the Big 12 conference.

Conference play began with a win over the Baylor Bears at home on September 18, and ended at home with a win over the Oklahoma State Cowboys in the annual Bedlam Series on November 27. The Sooners finished the regular season 7–4 (5–3 in Big 12), tied with Texas A&M for second in the Big 12 South. They were invited to the Independence Bowl, where they lost to the Ole Miss Rebels, 27-25.

Following the season, Stockar McDougle was selected 20th overall in the 2000 NFL Draft, along with William Bartee in the second round.

Preseason

After five straight non–winning seasons and failing to make a bowl appearance for four straight years, University of Oklahoma Athletic director Joe Castiglione decided to fire third–year coach John Blake at the end of the 1998 regular season and hire University of Florida Defensive coordinator Bob Stoops to replace Blake. Others considered for the job included Barry Alvarez, Jim Donnan, Bob Toledo, Dennis Franchione, Tommy Bowden, Gary Barnett, and Mike Bellotti. The decision to promote a defensive coordinator to head coach ran contrary to the conventional wisdom of the time, but from the beginning Stoops was expected to be an exception to that theory, even without any experience calling offensive plays.

Schedule

Game summaries

Indiana State

Baylor

Texas A&M

Colorado

Source: USA Today

Roster

Rankings

2000 NFL Draft 

The 2000 NFL Draft was held on April 15–16, 2000 at Madison Square Garden in New York City. The following Oklahoma players were either selected or signed as undrafted free agents following the draft.

References

Oklahoma
Oklahoma Sooners football seasons
Oklahoma Sooners football